Archibald Kaye (1869 – unknown) was a Scottish professional footballer who played as a goalkeeper.

References

1869 births
Year of death unknown
Footballers from Glasgow
Scottish footballers
Association football goalkeepers
Burnley F.C. players
English Football League players
Thistle F.C. players